Liolaemus griseus, the gray tree iguana, is a species of lizard in the family Liolaemidae. It is native to Argentina.

References

griseus
Reptiles described in 1984
Reptiles of Argentina
Taxa named by Raymond Laurent